William Lewis Shaw (born December 15, 1938) is an American former professional football player who played as a guard for the Buffalo Bills in the American Football League (AFL). After playing college football for the Georgia Tech Yellow Jackets, he was drafted by the Bills.  Shaw was the prototypical "pulling guard" who despite his size held his own against much bigger defensive linemen like Ernie Ladd, Earl Faison and Buck Buchanan. He won three straight Eastern Division titles and two American Football League championships in 1964 and 1965 with Buffalo.

Shaw was a first-team All-American Football League selection four times (1963–1966) and second-team All-AFL in 1968 and 1969. He played in eight American Football League All-Star Games and was named to the All-Time All-AFL Team.  He made the All-Decade All-pro football team of the 1960s.  Shaw played his entire career in the American Football League, and retired after the 1969 season.

Shaw is the only player ever inducted to the Pro Football Hall of Fame without ever playing in the NFL. (The Bills, along with the rest of the AFL, merged with the NFL the season following his retirement.) He is also a member of the Greater Buffalo Sports Hall of Fame and the Bills' 50th Anniversary Team.

Early years
Shaw participated in sports throughout his entire youth. He played end in high school football at a small school right outside of Vicksburg until the school decided to drop football. His father moved the family into town so Shaw could continue to play football at Carr Central. Weighing in at 188 pounds Shaw played offensive and defensive tackle at Carr his senior year.

College career 
Shaw played offense while he was at Georgia Tech. By his senior year, Shaw weighed in at 220 pounds. His senior year, he earned All-American honors as a two-way tackle and was named to the Georgia Tech All-Time Team. 
“Actually,” Shaw once said, “l thought I played defense much better than offense, and I still believe most of the honors I received were for my defensive play.”
After the season, Shaw was named to the 1961 College All-Star Team. The coach worked him for two weeks as a Defensive End until guard Houston Antwine injured his ankle. This is when Shaw began playing guard. The College All-Star Team that year played the Philadelphia Eagles. "I was scared to death,” Shaw recalled about playing the NFL champion Philadelphia Eagles in the annual All-Star contest. "I was up against Ed Khayat, a Mississippi boy who later finished his career with Boston (Patriots). I thought this might ease the tension a bit since he might take it easier on me. It was just the opposite. He turned me every way but loose.” Shaw played an amazing game, actually knocking the wind out of Eagle linebacker Maxie Baughan. In the 1961 draft, Shaw was drafted in the second round by the Buffalo Bills, and in the 14th round by the, then rival team of the Buffalo Bills, the Dallas Cowboys. “I had been in contact with the Cowboys mostly prior to the Bills getting involved,” recalled Shaw. “The Cowboys wanted to play me at linebacker. We had lengthy conversations at that point in time. The Bills wanted to play me at either defensive end or an offensive line position. I really wanted to play on the defensive side of the ball as a defensive end. So that triggered a real interest for me (in the Bills).”

Professional career 
Billy Shaw was drafted by the Dallas Cowboys and the Buffalo Bills in the 1961 NFL and AFL Drafts, respectively, and decided to sign with the Bills. Shaw did well at both blocking for the pass and for the run. With Bills' running backs tending to be more durable than fast, Shaw was the perfect guard. He could stay in front of the runners far down field. Shaw was known as "the driving force of the offensive unit." Shaw was a first-team All-American Football League selection four times (1963–1966) and second-team All-AFL in 1968 and 1969. He played in eight American Football League All-Star Games and was named to the All-Time All-AFL Team. He made the All-Decade All-pro football team of the 1960s. Shaw played his entire career in the American Football League, and retired after the 1969 AFL season. The 1962-1964 Bills are still ranked among the best in rushing touchdowns in a season in the team's record book.

Personal life 
Shaw married Patsy in 1960.

Shaw was inducted into Pro Football Hall of Fame in 1999. During his speech, he forgot to thank his wife. After taking pictures, he went back on stage and got on his knees and apologized.

See also
List of American Football League players

References

External links
 Pro Football Hall of Fame: Member profile

1938 births
Living people
American football offensive linemen
Buffalo Bills players
Georgia Tech Yellow Jackets football players
American Football League All-League players
American Football League All-Star players
American Football League All-Time Team
Pro Football Hall of Fame inductees
Sportspeople from Natchez, Mississippi
People from Toccoa, Georgia
Players of American football from Mississippi
American Football League players